Kristopher Grunert (born April 5, 1978) is Canadian commercial and fine art photographer. He is also an NFT photographer.

Biography
Kristopher Grunert was born in Yorkton, Saskatchewan. He credits his prairie upbringing for developing his visual and spatial sense. Perhaps his childhood environment is what propelled him toward scenes that honor human fortitude and expansion. Known for his appreciation for architectural structures and industrial processes, Grunert's style marries the phenomena of Earth's cycles with man-made creations.

In a personal development project called The Inspirers, Grunert pays homage to an expanding number of notable visionaries who have helped shape his vision. Among them are, architect I. M. Pei, director Andrei Tarkovsky, futurist Buckminster Fuller, aviation pioneer Amelia Earhart, and photographer Sebastião Salgado.

Work 
His commercial work is mainly focused on developing corporate media libraries, annual reports, documentation of architectural projects, and corporate publications, including Canadian Pacific Limited. Additionally, his commercial work extends to consumer publications, such as Wallpaper, Dezeen, and Applied Arts Magazine. As an NFT photographer, he is among the top selling artists on Ephimera.

Exhibitions

NFT exhibitions 

 2021 Exhibit I / Ephimera
 2021 NFT Art International / Stratosphere / Beijing

Solo exhibitions 
 2012 As Above, So Below Godfrey Dean Art Gallery / Yorkton  
2008 City: My Last 20 Polaroids / Jacana Gallery / Vancouver

Group exhibitions 

 2018 Collective Noun / Ian Tan Gallery / Capture Photography Festival 
 2017 Imagenation / Paris 
 2017 Lit - Ecc Preview Exhibit 
 2017 Rad Hombres / Vancouver 
 2009 The Seylynn Lights / Mopla / La
 2009 Vancouver Altered / On The Rise Collective / Vancouver
 2007 Urban Development - Trunk Gallery - Vancouver, Canada Viaducts + Arteries / Trunk Gallery / Vancouver
 2006 Urban Spaces / Viaducts / Jacana Gallery / Vancouver
 2005 (Dis)Tence / 125 Magazine / St.Luke's / London
 2005 (Dis)Tence / 125 Magazine / Corbis Gallery / NYC
 2004 Crop / Lumen Gallery / Vancouver
 2004 The Zone + The State Of Things / Ad!Dict Gallery / Brussels
 2004 The Zone / Fotokomission / Berlin
 2003 Industria / Gallery 83 / Vancouver
 2002 Endless Journey / Gallery 83 / Vancouver
 2001 (R)Evolution / Sugar Gallery / Vancouver
 2000 Industry 106 / Railtown Studios / Vancouver

Awards 
 2017 Tokyo International Foto Awards / HM / Landscape 
 2016 Applied Arts / Creative Excellence Award 
 2016 Applied Arts / Photo Annual 
 2015 aPhotoEditor /Promo of the Year 
 2015 Lotus Awards / Best Photography
 2014 International Photography Awards / HM 
 2010 International Photography Awards / 1st Industrial 
 2010 Photo District News / Self-Promo Awards / Best Digital Promotion
 2010 Applied Arts / Photo Annual 
 2009 International Photography Awards / 1st / Moving Images 
 2007 International Photography Awards / HM
 2007 Georgia Straight / Best Light Artist
 2006 Photo District News / Photo Annual / Best Website
 2006 International Photography Awards / HM
 2005 International Photography Awards / HM

References

External links 
 www.grunertimagining.com

1978 births
Living people
Artists from Saskatchewan
People from Yorkton
21st-century Canadian photographers